Conus zebroides, common name, the Quaga cone, is a species of predatory sea snail, a marine gastropod mollusk in the family Conidae, known as the cone snails, cone shells or cones.

Description
The size of an adult shell varies between 18 mm and 51 mm. The shell is yellowish brown, longitudinally, irregularly striped with chestnut, extending over the spire.

Distribution
This marine species is endemic to Angola.

Gallery

References 

 Kiener L.C. 1844–1850. Spécies général et iconographie des coquilles vivantes. Vol. 2. Famille des Enroulées. Genre Cone (Conus, Lam.), pp. 1–379, pl. 1–111 [pp. 1–48 (1846); 49–160 (1847); 161–192 (1848); 193–240 (1849); 241-[379](assumed to be 1850); plates 4,6 (1844); 2–3, 5, 7–32, 34–36, 38, 40–50 (1845); 33, 37, 39, 51–52, 54–56, 57–68, 74–77 (1846); 1, 69–73, 78–103 (1847); 104–106 (1848); 107 (1849); 108–111 (1850)]. Paris, Rousseau & J.B. Baillière
 Filmer R.M. (2001). A Catalogue of Nomenclature and Taxonomy in the Living Conidae 1758 - 1998. Backhuys Publishers, Leiden. 388pp.
 Tucker J.K. (2009). Recent cone species database. 4 September 2009 Edition.

External links
 
 Cone Shells – Knights of the Sea

zebroides
Gastropods described in 1845
Invertebrates of Angola
Endemic fauna of Angola
Gastropods of Africa
Taxonomy articles created by Polbot